Big Mountain may refer to:

Places

United States
 Big Mountain Air Force Station, Lake and Peninsula Borough, Alaska
 Big Mountain, Alaska, the location of the Air Force station
 Big Mountain, Arizona, another name for Black Mesa, Arizona
 Big Mountain (Broadwater County, Montana), a mountain in Broadwater County, Montana
 Big Mountain (Flathead County, Montana), a mountain in Flathead County, Montana
 Big Mountain (Jefferson County, Montana), a mountain in Jefferson County, Montana
 Big Mountain (Madison County, Montana), a mountain in Madison County, Montana
 The Big Mountain, a ski resort in Montana
 Big Mountain (Oklahoma), a mountain ridge in Pushmataha County, Oklahoma
 Big Mountain (Pennsylvania), a mountain ridge in Pennsylvania
 Big Mountain Pass, a mountain pass in Utah

Entertainment
 Big Mountain (band), an American reggae band
 Big Mountain 2000, a video game
 Big Mountain Short Film Festival, held in Ohakune, New Zealand

Other
 Big mountain skiing, a type of freestyle skiing
 Big mountain palm, Hedyscepe canterburyana

See also